Sport Vereniging Estudiantes Maritimo (English:Sports Club) (known as SV Estudiantes Aruba) or simply Estudiantes is an Aruban football club based in Oranjestad, which currently play in Aruba's second division,  Division Uno.

Achievements
Copa Betico Croes: 1
2006

Players

Current squad
As of 28 October 2021

External links
Facebook page
YouTube channel

References

Estudiantes